Clarissa Smith Williams (April 21, 1859 – March 8, 1930) was the sixth Relief Society General President of the Church of Jesus Christ of Latter-day Saints (LDS Church) from 1921 to 1928. Williams was the first native Utahn to become Relief Society president.

Biography
Clarissa Smith was born in Salt Lake City, Utah Territory, to Susan West, the seventh wife of LDS Church apostle George A. Smith.

In 1901, Williams was asked to serve as treasurer of the Relief Society by Bathsheba W. Smith, Smith's first wife. Williams served in this position until 1910, when she became the first counselor to president Emmeline B. Wells in the Relief Society general presidency. She held this position until 1921, when she was chosen to succeed Wells as president after Wells's death. Due to failing health, Williams asked to be released from her calling in 1928 and was succeeded by Louise Y. Robison. Williams died of nephritis in Salt Lake City and was buried in the Salt Lake City Cemetery.

Williams married William N. Williams on July 17, 1877 and was the mother of eleven children (including George Albert, Bathsheba, Lyman, Clarissa, Sarah, Eva, Georgia).

Publications in the Relief Society Magazine

Articles

References

External links
"Clarissa Smith Williams", churchofjesuschrist.org
Nola Redd, Relief Society Presidents: Clarissa S. Williams
Tributes to Williams in Relief Society Magazine

1859 births
1930 deaths
American leaders of the Church of Jesus Christ of Latter-day Saints
Burials at Salt Lake City Cemetery
Counselors in the General Presidency of the Relief Society
Deaths from nephritis
General Presidents of the Relief Society
People from Salt Lake City
Smith family (Latter Day Saints)
Latter Day Saints from Utah